Francis Henty (30 November 1815 – 15 January 1889), was an early settler of Australia.

Background
Francis was brother of James Henty, William Henty and Edward Henty, the youngest son of Thomas Henty, was born at Field Place, Worthing, Sussex, on 30 November 1815, and emigrated to Tasmania with his father. He subsequently followed his brother Edward to Portland, Victoria, landing a month later than that Edward, on 14 December 1834. Having returned to Tasmania on a visit in the following year, he called in at Port Phillip (now Melbourne) in September, and assisted Mr. Batman, the founder of the city, to pitch a tent on what was afterwards known as Batman's Hill. In the last week of August 1836 Sir Thomas Mitchell, the explorer, visited Portland on his way overland from Sydney to the southern shore of the continent. At this time there was no one settled nearer Portland than where Melbourne now stands, and the appearance of a stranger was somewhat startling in those days of escaped convicts. However, the Major was recognised by one of the establishment. He was furnished with supplies, had the pleasure of witnessing the excitement of a whale chase, and in return informed the Messrs. Henty of the existence of the fine country at the back of Portland, on the Wannon River, which he had named Australia Felix. Hitherto the latter had not gone more than twenty miles inland with their flocks.

The Henty brothers engaged in bay whaling at Portland Bay in the 1830s during the winter months. The whale oil and bone (baleen) taken there from captured southern right whales by their men was shipped to Tasmania for export to Britain.

Growing country

On 3 August 1837, a settlement was commenced in this country at the spot since known as Merino Downs, of which Francis Henty became the owner. Conflicts between the blacks and some of the whites could scarcely be avoided, but Mr. Henty had not much trouble, the aborigines soon becoming friendly; but they were never allowed to bring their spears and other weapons within a certain distance of the hut. To show how quickly the country was taken up after the first essay had been made, it may be mentioned that in 1839 Messrs. James and Stephen G. Henty rode overland from Geelong to Portland, and were able to obtain shelter each night during the whole journey. Mr. Henty, though maintaining his establishment at Merino Downs, resided for the last few years of his life in Melbourne. He married at Launceston, Tasmania, Mrs Mary Ann Lawrence, who died in November 1881. Henty died at Kew, near Melbourne, on 15 January 1889.

Ship
There is a passing mention in an article in the Adelaide Observer in 1923 of a ship named Francis Henty which sailed to Melbourne in 1851. It was caught in a typhoon in 1872.

References

1815 births
1889 deaths
People from Worthing
Australian people in whaling
Australian pastoralists
Australian ship owners
Settlers of Victoria (Australia)
19th-century Australian businesspeople